Olev Toomet (25 November 1929 Veriora Parish, Võru County – 31 March 2009 Kõlleste Parish, Põlva County) is an Estonian politician. He was a member of VIII Riigikogu.

References

1929 births
2009 deaths
People's Union of Estonia politicians
Members of the Riigikogu, 1995–1999
People from Räpina Parish